Soundtracks may refer to:

 The plural of soundtrack
 Soundtracks (Can album)
 Soundtracks (Tony Banks album), an album by Tony Banks of Genesis